Filip Manojlović (born 25 April 1996) is a Serbian football goalkeeper who plays for Spartak Subotica.

Club career

Red Star Belgrade

Early years & loan spells
Born in Belgrade, Manojlović started playing football with Radnički Beograd and later moved to Red Star Belgrade, where he passed all youth categories. He was loaned to Sopot for the 2014–15 season. After he made 22 Serbian League Belgrade appearances as a bonus player, and was nominated for the man of the match at two times, Manojlović moved on new loan to Bežanija, where he spent the 2015–16 season on dual registration. He was also loaned to OFK Bačka, where he made 7 SuperLiga caps for the first half of 2016–17 season.

First team breakthrough
Manojlović signed his first three-year professional contract with club in February 2014. Joining the first team, Manojlović started 2014–15 Serbian SuperLiga season as the 4th choice behind Predrag Rajković, Damir Kahriman and Marko Trkulja. He was also loaned on dual registrations for the next two seasons to get a senior experience, being also licensed with the first team as a back-up option for the Serbian SuperLiga. In summer 2016, Manojlović moved to OFK Bačka at six-month loan, where he made his first appearances in the first tier of the Serbian football pyramid. However, a loan deal had been terminated shortly after and Manojlović returned to Red Star in last days of the summer transfer window. On 14 September 2016, Manojlović extended his contract with club until summer 2020. He made his official debut for Red Star Belgrade in eternal derby, played on 17 September 2016 under coach Miodrag Božović. Manojlović collected 29 appearances in both domestic competitions including league and cup games, missing several matches before the end of a season under Boško Đurovski. Manojlović also started new season as a first choice under new manager, Vladan Milojević. On 29 June 2017, he made his first continental appearance for the club in first leg of the first qualifying round for 2017–18 UEFA Europa League, against Floriana, keeping a clean sheet. Making 4 appearances at the beginning of the season, Manojlović left the club after the match against Irtysh Pavlodar, played on 20 July 2017.

Getafe
On 21 July 2017, Manojlović signed a four-year contract with Getafe.

Panionios
On 26 July 2018, Getafe officially announced on Thursday that international goalkeeper Filip Manojlović will join Greek Super League club Panionios, on loan until the end of 2018–19 season.

International career
After he was a member of Serbia U19 national football team in 2015, Manojlović won 2015 FIFA U-20 World Cup. In December 2015, Manojlović appeared for Serbia U23 team in friendly match against Qatar, under coach Milan Rastavac. He debuted for U21 team on 25 March 2016 in a match against Andorra. Coach Slavoljub Muslin invited Manojlović for a friendly match of the Serbia national football team against Qatar in September 2016. He also received a call for a friendly match against United States, on 29 January 2017, when he made a debut for the team.

Career statistics

Club

International

Honours

Club
Red Star Belgrade
 Serbian SuperLiga: 2015–16

International
Serbia
FIFA U-20 World Cup: 2015

Notes & references

External links
 
 
 
 
 

1996 births
Living people
Footballers from Belgrade
Serbian footballers
Association football goalkeepers
Serbian First League players
Serbian SuperLiga players
Red Star Belgrade footballers
FK Sopot players
FK Bežanija players
OFK Bačka players
Segunda División B players
Getafe CF footballers
UD San Sebastián de los Reyes players
Super League Greece players
Panionios F.C. players
FK Spartak Subotica players
Serbian expatriate footballers
Serbian expatriate sportspeople in Spain
Serbian expatriate sportspeople in Greece
Expatriate footballers in Spain
Expatriate footballers in Greece
Serbia youth international footballers
Serbia under-21 international footballers
Serbia international footballers